Felix Restrepo Mejía S. J. (1887–1965) was a Jesuit priest, writer, pedagogue, classical scholar and humanist. Born in Medellín, Colombia, he was educated in Jesuit schools in this city and in Burgos and Oña (both in Spain) and Munich, Germany.

He was rector of the Pontificia Universidad Javeriana, also a Jesuit school, in Bogotá, between 1940 and 1949. By initiative of Jorge Eliecer Gaitán, (Minister of Education and later candidate to the presidency of Colombia, assassinated in 1949) founded the Ateneo Nacional de Altos Estudios (National Athenaeum of Higher Learning) which became later the Instituto Caro y Cuervo , one of the most prestigious philological and linguistic research institutions in the Spanish language.

External links
 Rubén Páez Patiño. 1966. Restrepo, Felix S. J. Noticias Culturales, N° 61, 1966. Gran Enciclopedia de Colombia. Círculo de Lectores
 Felix Restrepo S. J. Autobiografía

1887 births
1965 deaths
Colombian Jesuits
People from Medellín
Christian humanists
20th-century Colombian Roman Catholic priests